Carex oligocarya is a tussock-forming species of perennial sedge in the family Cyperaceae. It is native to Pakistan and the western part of the Himalayas.

See also
List of Carex species

References

oligocarya
Plants described in 1894
Taxa named by Charles Baron Clarke
Flora of Pakistan